Enitan Ransome-Kuti (born 1964) is a Nigerian Army officer and son of the late human rights activist Beko Ransome-Kuti. In 2015, he served as the Commander of the Multinational Joint Task Force.

Early life and education
Enitan was born in Lagos. He is an alumnus of the Nigerian Military School, Zaria and the Nigeria Defence Academy where he had his formal education before receiving his commission into the Nigerian Army.

Career
After rising through the ranks of the army to a brigadier general, Enitan was appointed Commander of the Multinational Joint Task Force. On 15 October 2015, he was dismissed from the Nigerian Army by a court martial and sentenced to six-months imprisonment after he was found guilty for "cowardice" and "mutiny" following the Baga attacks by the Boko Haram sect in 2015. His sentence and dismissal was however commuted on 3 March 2016 and he was demoted to the rank of colonel.

References

1964 births
Ransome-Kuti family
Nigerian Army officers
Nigerian generals
Nigerian Military School alumni
Nigerian Defence Academy alumni
Multinational Joint Task Force Commanders
Living people
People from Lagos
Yoruba military personnel
Residents of Lagos